Dalston is a district of London, England.

Dalston may also refer to:
Dalston, Cumbria, a village in North West England
Dalston (Hackney ward), an electoral ward in London, England
Dalston, Ontario, Canada
Dalston baronets

People with the surname
George Dalston (1581–1657), English politician
William Dalston (died 1683), English politician

See also
Dalston railway station (disambiguation)